Altolaguirre is a surname. Notable people with the surname include:

Hernán Altolaguirre (born 1993), Argentine footballer
Manuel Altolaguirre (1905–1959), Spanish poet, editor, and publisher